Albert Hughes is a filmmaker.

Albert Hughes may also refer to:

Albert Hughes (bishop)
Albert Hughes (ice hockey)